The 2013–14 season is the third season of the SEHA League and 10 teams from Bosnia and Herzegovina, Croatia, Macedonia, Montenegro, Slovakia, Serbia and Belarus participate in it.

Team information

Venues and locations

Regular season

Standings

Results
In the table below the home teams are listed on the left and the away teams along the top.

Final four

Semifinals

Match for third place

Finals

References

SEHA Bulletin No. 18
SEHA Bulletin No. 19

External links
Official website

SEHA League
2013–14 domestic handball leagues